Jimmy Bond is a fictional character in the American Fox television shows The Lone Gunmen and The X-Files, two science fiction shows about government conspiracies to hide or deny the truth from the people. Portrayed by American actor Stephen Snedden, Jimmy was a main character in the first and only season of The Lone Gunmen and made one appearance in The X-Files.

He was an associate of The Lone Gunmen, he worked with the group and helped to finance their newspaper through his family's wealth. In contrast to the cynical, intellectual, world-weary Gunmen, Jimmy is portrayed as a somewhat naive, idealistic all-American man wanting to make a difference. Though his lack of book smarts and occasional clumsiness exasperates the Gunmen at first, he eventually proves himself useful by offering an outsider's perspective on certain cases, and remains dedicated to the Gunmen even after their death. He is also known for his mostly-unrequited love for the Gunmens' chief competitor and sometimes-collaborator, Yves Adele Harlow. His fate after the Gunmens' funeral in The X-Files episode, "Jump the Shark" is unknown.

Character arc
The Lone Gunmen first encountered Jimmy while pursuing a lead in the death of a well known hacker. They find him on a football field coaching a practice game of American football with a twist: the entire team is blind. The Lone Gunmen believe that Jimmy's charity organisation is a front for arms dealers and they had first thought Jimmy was the mastermind, thinking that "James Bond" was an obvious pseudonym.  However, after speaking to him they realise their mistake, Jimmy is a charming, idealistic young man with no clue as to where his patronage really comes from. After they solved the case of the death of the hacker, Jimmy decided he would like to help The Lone Gunmen and paid for the copies of the latest issue of The Lone Gunman that they could not afford to retrieve from the printers.

Jimmy truly believed in the work The Lone Gunmen were doing in searching for and printing the truth. He loved the three conspiracy theorists, though he annoyed them when he was a bit slow to pick up on things. When The Lone Gunmen were searching for a water powered car in a disused military bunker they appeared to become trapped beneath a pile of reinforced concrete when these bunkers were blown up. Jimmy wouldn't listen to reason from Yves and kept trying to sledge hammer his way down through a demolished missile silo to reach The Lone Gunmen. They turned up shortly afterward, having found a way out through ventilation shafts that came out above ground under a portable toilet. Despite the fact they were covered in toilet contents Jimmy was overwhelmed to see them alive and hugged all three of them at once. This incident was a perfect example of his love for his friends.

He was the one who figured out why the intelligent chimp that they had helped escape from a test lab had really gotten out. He helped Simon the chimp (slave name Peanuts) switch places with a chimp in a zoo, so he could be re-united with his girlfriend. It was Jimmy who realised the real reason why Simon wanted to escape whereas The Lone Gunmen were following the idea that the chimps were being trained as assassins. Jimmy often became the heart of the group as he was more inclined to see the good in people, particularly Yves Adele Harlow and senator Jefferson. Contrary to Frohike and Langly, he also showed no disgust or prejudice towards Byers' transgender college roommate.

As Jimmy worked with The Lone Gunmen he also encountered Harlow and became enamored of her. She looked on his affection mainly with scorn but now and again she was obviously touched by the fact that he cared. Jimmy was the one who always gave her the benefit of the doubt anytime The Lone Gunmen questioned what she was doing. He believed that even though she was a thief and usually only out for profit that she was a good person. After Yves disappeared following her capture by Morris Fletcher, Jimmy spent a year tracking her all over the world. He only came back to The Lone Gunmen when he ran out of money and could no longer follow her. They were later re-united when he and The Lone Gunmen finally caught up with Yves and was persuaded to stay by John Doggett and Monica Reyes.

Conceptual history 
After looking at the "Pilot" episode, the series' writers realized that they needed one more character because The Lone Gunmen, even though the writers had staked out different positions for all three of them, were essentially very alike and had similar knowledge so they needed someone to explain their knowledge to, because having this interaction on-screen would simultaneously help relate to the audience what The Lone Gunmen knew and what was happening in each episode. Hence, the writers created Jimmy Bond, a character who would not only serve this function but also be different from The Lone Gunmen in that he was classically good-looking, an attribute that would also allow him to serve as a potential love interest for Yves Adele Harlow. The potential of this relationship was also unlikely for the three Lone Gunmen, additionally helping to differ the new character from the series' already created protagonists.

Actor Stephen Snedden was subsequently cast in the role. He was at first unsure of what reactions his work on the character would invoke, because the role was slightly absurd, but he nevertheless went ahead with filming "Bond, Jimmy Bond", accepting the situation and hoping that everyone would like his performance. Even though he knew he would return in other episodes, many members of the production crew were under the erroneous impression that he was only a guest star in this single episode. Consequently, even after this episode was filmed, the actor was approached by several of the crew who voiced their appreciation of his character but were acting like it would be unlikely that they would see him again, since they believed it would be.

References

External links

Bond, Jimmy
American television spin-offs